Frankhawthorneite Cu2Te6+O4(OH)2 is a monoclinic copper tellurate mineral (space group P21/n) named after Prof. Frank Christopher Hawthorne (born 1946), University of Manitoba, Winnipeg, Canada. It was discovered at Centennial Eureka Mine, Tintic District, East Tintic Mountains, Juab County, Utah, in 1995. It has a leaf green color.

See also
 List of minerals named after people

References

Copper(II) minerals
Juab County, Utah
Tellurate and selenate minerals
Monoclinic minerals
Minerals in space group 14